Thomas Burnside (July 28, 1782March 25, 1851) was an American politician and judge who served as a Democratic-Republican member of the United States House of Representatives for Pennsylvania's 9th congressional district from 1815 to 1816 and as an associate justice of the Supreme Court of Pennsylvania from 1845 until his death in 1851.

Early life and education
Thomas Burnside was born near Newtownstewart, County Tyrone in the Kingdom of Ireland.  He emigrated to the United States with his father’s family, who settled in Norristown, Pennsylvania, in 1793.  He studied law, was admitted to the bar in 1804 and commenced practice in Bellefonte, Pennsylvania.

Career
He was appointed deputy attorney general on January 12, 1809, and served in the Pennsylvania State Senate for the 13th district from 1811 to 1814 and again from 1823 to 1826 when he also served as Speaker of the Senate.

Burnside was elected as a Democratic-Republican to the Fourteenth Congress to fill the vacancy caused by the death of David Bard and served until his resignation in April 1816.  He was appointed president judge of the Luzerne district courts in 1815, and resigned in 1819.  He was again a member of the Pennsylvania State Senate and its presiding officer in 1823.  He was president judge of the fourth judicial district from 1826 to 1841 and later presided in the same capacity over the seventh judicial district.  He was appointed an associate justice of the Supreme Court of Pennsylvania in 1845, which office he held until his death in Germantown, Pennsylvania.  Interment in Union Cemetery in Bellefonte, Pennsylvania.

Notes

References

The Political Graveyard

|-

1782 births
1851 deaths
19th-century American judges
19th-century American lawyers
19th-century American politicians
Burials in Pennsylvania
Democratic-Republican Party members of the United States House of Representatives from Pennsylvania
Irish emigrants to the United States (before 1923)
Pennsylvania lawyers
Pennsylvania state court judges
Pennsylvania state senators
People from Newtownstewart
Justices of the Supreme Court of Pennsylvania